Pskovavia was a passenger and cargo airline based in Pskov, Russia. It operated international and domestic charter passenger and cargo services as well as regular scheduled flights between Pskov and Moscow. Its main base was Pskov Airport.

History 

The airline was established and started operations in 1944. It was formerly Aeroflot Pskov Division.

The Federal Agency for Air Transport (Rosaviatsia) suspended the Pskovavia airline flight certificate on April 4, 2018. Pskovavia was replaced by the airline "Azimuth".

Destinations

Pskovavia carried out scheduled flights between Pskov (Pskov Airport) and Moscow (Domodedovo Airport) on Mondays, Wednesdays, and Fridays.
On 20 June 2013 Pskovavia announced St Petersburg (Pulkovo Airport) flights would resume, starting in August 2013.

As of July 2013 Pskovavia served the following destinations:

Russia
 Bryansk Oblast
Bryansk – Bryansk Airport
 Karelia
Petrozavodsk – Besovets Airport
 Kursk Oblast
Kursk – Kursk Vostochny Airport
 Moscow /  Moscow Oblast
Moscow – Moscow Domodedovo Airport
 Murmansk Oblast
Apatity / Kirovsk – Khibiny Airport
 Pskov Oblast
Pskov – Pskov Airport base
 Saint Petersburg /  Leningrad Oblast
Saint Petersburg – Pulkovo Airport

Tambov - Tambov Donskoye Airport
 Vladimir Oblast
Vladimir - Semyazino Airport
 Vologda Oblast
Vologda – Vologda Airport

Pskovavia's AN-26 also frequently visits Helsinki-Vantaa airport during early evenings.

Fleet 

As of July 2019 the Pskovavia fleet included:

2 Antonov An-26 – Stored 
5 Antonov An-24 – Stored

References

External links
 Pskovavia Official website

Defunct airlines of Russia
Cargo airlines
Former Aeroflot divisions
Airlines established in 1944
Companies based in Pskov Oblast
1944 establishments in the Soviet Union